The Sony FX3 is Sony's latest full-frame mirrorless interchangeable-lens compact cinema camera announced on February 23, 2021. The FX3 is based on the α7S III camera which was released the previous year. The camera will be available in mid-March 2021.  The starting price of USD 3900/GBP 4200 makes it the most affordable model in Sony's Cinema line aimed at profilmmakers.

Features

Improved FX3 Features 

 Comfortable, cage-free, handheld operation
 Greater than 1.6x battery runtime compared to a7S III
 USB-PD power option for extended shooting time

Common FX3/a7S III Features 

 Full-frame camera
 Back-illuminated 12.1MP Exmor R CMOS sensor
 BIONZ XR processor
 High-speed rates of 120p in 4K and 240p in HD
 Dynamic range of 15+ stops

Shared FX3/A7S III Attributes 

 5-axis in-body image stabilization
 16-bit raw output via HDMI
 S-Log2 gamma choice
 80 to 409,600 ISO range (expanded)

Cinematic Recording 
The FX3 comes with an S-Cinetone, a video preset used by Sony's cinema cameras. The FX3 can do UHD 4K capture similar to α7S III camera. The video-forward design of the FX3 also shares several handling and audio features with the FX6 and the ISO range and battery of the a7S III.

Criticisms 

Many reviewers of the FX3 have addressed a few key shortcomings of the FX3.  First, the lack of internally adjustable ND calls into question whether this is actually a ‘cinema’ camera as Sony asserts it to be.  It has been said Sony chose to prioritize In-body Image Stabilization (IBIS) over ND which is odd given professionals are likely to hard-mount the camera or use a gimbal. Second, at the time of launch the FX3 is unable to set shutter angle (an essential filmmaking parameter). And lastly, the body.  Many reviewers suggest the handle-grip on the body does not reflect how people are most likely going to use a ‘cinema camera’ and most have suggested they would rather give-up the handle in favour of internal ND adjustment.

See also
List of Sony E-mount cameras
Sony α7S III

References

External links
 

Sony ILME-FX3
Cameras introduced in 2021
Full-frame mirrorless interchangeable lens cameras